John Contee Fairfax (September 18, 1830 – September 25, 1900) was an American citizen and heir to a Scottish peerage.

Early life
John Contee Fairfax was born at Vaucluse, Virginia, the second son of Albert Fairfax (April 15, 1802 – May 9, 1835) and Caroline Eliza Snowden (April 21, 1812 – December 28, 1899), who were married on April 7, 1828.  His elder brother was Charles S. Fairfax, 10th Lord Fairfax of Cameron.

Personal life
He married Mary Brown Kirby, daughter of Col. Edward Kirby (US Army), in 1857. They had the following children:
Caroline Snowden Fairfax
Josephine Fairfax, who married Tunstall Smith
Albert Fairfax, 12th Lord Fairfax of Cameron (1870-1939), who married Maude Wishart McKelvie.

He died at age 70 in his country home Northampton, in Prince George's County, Maryland. At the time of his death he was the only American citizen to be considered a member of the British peerage.

See also
Lord Fairfax of Cameron

References 

1830 births
1900 deaths
19th-century American Episcopalians
American people of English descent
American people of Scottish descent
John
People from Fairfax County, Virginia
People from Prince George's County, Maryland
Lords Fairfax of Cameron